Jason Keyser is an American extreme metal vocalist. Keyser joined death metal band Skinless as their new frontman in November 2004. Jason has released one album with Skinless (Trample the Weak, Hurdle the Dead, 2006) and another album with Detriment (Plague Rituals, 2004). He is also currently a member of brutal death metal band Mucopus, providing the vocals on their 2007 release Undimensional.  Jason Keyser is the brother of Joe Keyser, who plays the bass in Skinless.  Jason Joined Origin in 2011. He graduated with a bachelor's degree in anthropology in upstate New York at Skidmore College in 2013.

References 

Year of birth missing (living people)
American male singers
American heavy metal singers
Death metal musicians
Living people
Skidmore College alumni